Ogu or OGU may refer to:
 Ogu people, an ethnic group in Nigeria
 Ogu–Bolo, a local government area in Rivers State, Nigeria 
 Ordu–Giresun Airport, an airport in Turkey

Other uses
 OGUsers or "OGU", an internet forum
 John Ogu, a professional footballer